Gerald A. Reynolds (born 1964) is an American politician and lawyer who served as chairman of the United States Commission on Civil Rights from 2004 to 2011. A member of the Republican Party, he was appointed by President George W. Bush on December 6, 2004. He succeeded Mary Frances Berry and served a six-year term as chairman.

Education
He received his Bachelor of Arts degree in history from York College and his Juris Doctor degree from Boston University School of Law, where he served on the editorial board of the American Journal of Law & Medicine.

Career
Prior to his government work, he served as the president of the Center for New Black Leadership, and worked as a legal analyst for the Center for Equal Opportunity. He practiced law with Schatz & Schatz, Ribicoff & Kotkin, a firm based out of Connecticut. On March 29, 2002, Reynolds was appointed by Bush to the position of Assistant Secretary of Education for the Office for Civil Rights. 

He later served as a deputy associate attorney general in the United States Department of Justice, providing legal advice on various matters to the United States Associate Attorney General. He has served on the national advisory board of Project 21, a program within the National Center for Public Policy Research, that seeks to provide a forum for conservatives within the black community. Since 2012, he has worked as general counsel, chief compliance officer, and corporate secretary at LG&E and KU Energy.

Writing
Reynolds has written articles on public policy issues, which were published in various publications, including Black Family Today, The Dallas Morning News, The CQ Researcher, Orange Register, and The Washington Times. He edited a book on race within the criminal justice system.

References

External links
 

1964 births
Living people
Boston University School of Law alumni
United States Commission on Civil Rights members
Date of birth missing (living people)
Place of birth missing (living people)
York College, City University of New York alumni
George W. Bush administration personnel
African-American government officials
Connecticut Republicans